Jean-Michel Vandamme (born 10 November 1959) is a French football executive, and former professional player and coach, who is currently the academy general manager of French Ligue 1 club Lille.

Career
After retiring from professional football, Jean-Michel Vandamme became Lille first-team assistant coach in 1984. In 1989, he then left the club for Derby du Nord rivals Lens and joined the first-team coaching staff as assistant coach.

In 1993, after this short experience, he returned to Lille and was appointed as academy general manager of the Northmen. He was then appointed as technical advisor of president Michel Seydoux in 2009, and as head of recruitment in 2011.

Vandamme left his longtime club in 2018 with Luis Campos' arrival as Lille new technical advisor under Gérard Lopez presidency. As a consequence, he signed with Saint-Étienne, being appointed as head of recruitment in 2019, and worked for Club Brugge as well.

On 20 April 2021, he returned to Lille and was appointed again as academy general manager.

Under his watch as academy general manager, Lille renowned youth programme has produced many talents over the years. Eden Hazard, Yohan Cabaye, Mathieu Debuchy, Idrissa Gueye, Lucas Digne, Divock Origi, Benjamin Pavard or Martin Terrier have come through the ranks and are just some of the talents who have played for the club.

Honours

Player
Lille
Division 2: 1977–78

References

External links
 
 Jean-Michel Vandamme at SoFoot.com

1959 births
Living people
French footballers
French football managers
Lille OSC players
Lille OSC non-playing staff